Long Swamp Creek is a stream in the U.S. state of Georgia. It is a tributary to the Etowah River.

The English name "Long Swamp Creek" is a translation of its native Indian name. A Native American Indian village, Long Swamp Site, once stood near its mouth.

References

Rivers of Georgia (U.S. state)
Rivers of Cherokee County, Georgia
Rivers of Pickens County, Georgia